The Skelani massacre refers to the Army of the Republic of Bosnia and Herzegovina (ARBiH) attack on Skelani, group of villages in region of Srebrenica, Bosnia and Herzegovina, held by Army of Republika Srpska (VRS), which happened on 16 January 1993. Between 40-65 Serbs were killed in the attack.

ICTY findings
During Bosnian War, the Army of Republika Srpska (VRS) attacked Bosniak cities and villages in eastern Bosnia, as part of its "six strategic goals" of "eliminating the Drina river as a border" between Serbia and Bosnian Serbs. Although the Serb forces took control of Zvornik,  Bratunac, and Vlasenica municipalities during the first half of 1992, pockets in the surrounding area remained outside of their reach, with Bosniaks offering resistance. The Serb forces started the siege of Srebrenica. Between April 1992 and March 1993, the Srebrenica areas were constantly subjected to Serb military assaults, including artillery attacks, sniper fire, as well as occasional bombing from aircraft.

The Bosnian Serb forces controlled the access roads and forbade international humanitarian aid to reach the Srebrenica enclave, not even allowing food and medical relief. As a consequence, there was a constant shortage of food. This starvation peaked in the winter of 1992/93. 

In order to overcome this shortage, the Bosniaks occasionally stormed nearby Serb villages in search for food, often risking dying or being wounded from land mines or Serb fire.
On 16 January 1993 soldiers of the ARBiH, allegedly led by Naser Orić, attacked the villages of Skelani.

The Bosniak forces almost reached the border with Serbia, but were stopped a kilometer within Skelani due to an intervention by the Yugoslav Army and Territorial Defense units from the Užice Corps. The Bosniak forces came so close that some were even machine-gunning Serb civilians fleeing across the border to Bajina Bašta, Serbia.

Serbian narrative
Dozens of Serbs were killed in the attack. According to Serb sources numbers claimed vary between dozen to 40, or 65 killed, around a hundred wounded, while purportedly 30 people were taken prisoners and beaten, and 2 children killed, allegedly all civilians from Skelani village and its hamlets of Ćosići, Žabokvica, Toplica i Kalimanići, wider region of Srebrenica.

Memorial 
In the village of Skelani in 2005 the Government of Republika Srpska erected a monument for 305 Serb victims, alleging that they were all civilians who were killed during the war (1992–1995). The monument claims that 32 children were among killed.

References

Sources

Massacres in the Bosnian War
Massacres of Serbs
Bosniak war crimes in the Bosnian War
January 1993 events in Europe
January 1993 crimes
1993 in Bosnia and Herzegovina
Mass murder in 1993
Srebrenica
Army of the Republic of Bosnia and Herzegovina